In Greek mythology, Pleisthenes or Plisthenes, is the name of several members of the house of Tantalus, the most important being a son of Atreus, said to be the father of Agamemnon and Menelaus. Although these two brothers are usually considered to be the sons of Atreus himself, according to some accounts, Pleisthenes was their father, but he died, and Agamemnon and Menelaus were adopted by their grandfather Atreus.

Father of Agamemnon and Menelaus
The Pleisthenes who was said to have been the father of Agamemnon and Menelaus is a puzzling figure, with a confused genealogy, complicated by the existence of other members of the house of Tantalus with the same name. According to the usual version of the story, followed by the Iliad and Odyssey of Homer, Atreus, the king of Mycenae was the father of Agamemnon and Menelaus, by Aerope, the daughter of the Cretan king Catreus. However, according to another tradition, Pleisthenes, the son of Atreus (or Pelops?) was the father, probably by Aerope, of Agamemnon and Menelaus, although some accounts have the mother  as Cleolla or Eriphyle.

According to varying accounts, Pleisthenes' wife was Aerope, who he had received from the mariner hero Nauplius. Aerope's father Catreus, either because, he found her in bed with a slave, or because of an oracle which said that one of his children would kill him, gave Aerope to Nauplius, to be either drowned, or sold as a slave. However, in both versions of the story, Nauplius spared Aerope and gave her to Pleisthenes.

According to this tradition, apparently, Pleisthenes died young, and Agamemnon and Menelaus were raised by their grandfather Atreus. Such accounts were perhaps attempts to reconcile contradictory traditions.

Other Pleisthenes
There were apparently other members of the house of Tantalus also named Pleisthenes:

Pleisthenes, the son of Pelops. Some scholars have equated this Pleisthenes with the Pleisthenes who was the father of Agamenmnon and Menelaus.
Pleisthenes, along with his brother Tantalus, were the infant sons of Thyestes and Aerope, who Atreus killed and served to Thyestes at a banquet.
Pleisthenes, the son of Menealus and Helen of Troy, taken to Helen with her to Cypris.

Sources
In Homer's  Iliad and Odyssey, Pleisthenes is nowhere mentioned, and Agamemnon and Menelaus were the sons of Atreus However, from ancient commentators on the Iliad we are told of another tradition, followed by Hesiod, Aeschylus, Porphyry, and "others", in which Pleisthenes was the father of Agamemnon and Menelaus. An Iliad scholium says that, according to Hesiod, Agamemnon was the son of Pleisthenes and Aerope. Another Iliad scholium, citing Porphyry and "many others", says that Pleisthenes fathered Agamemnon and Menelaus, did nothing of note, and died young, with Atreus raising his sons.

Neither, of these Iliad scholia say who Pleisthenes' parents were, but Tzetzes' in his commentary on the Iliad, says that his father was Atreus and that, rather than being his wife, Aerope was his mother:
According to Hesiod, Aeschylus, and some others, Pleisthenes was the son of Atreus and Aerope, and the children of Pleisthenes and Dias’ daughter Cleolla were Agamemnon, Menelaus, and Anaxibia. Because Pleisthenes died young, they were brought up by their grandfather Atreus, and so they are considered by many to be Atreids.

In a scholium on Euripides' Orestes (which has sometimes been attributed to Hellanicus), Pleisthenes is again the son of Atreus, and the father of Agamemnon, Menelaus and Anaxibia, but Cleolla, rather than being Pleisthenes' wife, is his mother, and his wife is the otherwise unknown Eriphyle.

The patronymic "Pleisthenides" occurs in several ancient sources. Stesichorus uses it twice, probably referring to Menelaus, in one fragment (209 PMG), and Agamemnon, in another (219 PMG). Ibycus refers to Agamemnon as "the king Pleisthenides, leader of men, son of noble father Atreus" (282 PMG), which would seemingly make some Pleisthenes an ancestor of Atreus. Bacchylides, in the same poem, refers to Menelaus as both "Atreides"  and "Pleisthenides". Aeschylus's Agamemnon, refers to Agamemnon's family as the Pleisthenidae ("house of Pleisthenes"), and the "race of Pleisthenes", although exactly which branch of Agamemnon's family is meant is unclear.

Pleisthenes was also the subject of Euripides's lost tragedy, Pleisthenes. A possible plot for the play is found in Hyginus, Fabulae 86:
Because Thyestes, son of Pelops and Hippodamia, lay with Aëropa, Atreus’ wife, he was banished from the kingdom by his brother Atreus. But he sent Atreus’ son, Plisthenes, whom he had reared as his own, to Atreus to be killed. Atreus, believing him to be his brother’s son, unknowingly killed his own son.

The mythographer Apollodorus gives an account of how Aerope came to be Pliesthenes' wife:
And Catreus gave Aerope and Clymene to Nauplius to sell into foreign lands; and of these two Aerope became the wife of Plisthenes, who begat Agamemnon and Menelaus;
However, elsewhere he has Aerope as the wife of Atreus, and Agamemnon and Menelaus as the sons of her and Atreus,

Scholia to Pindar's Olympian 1 mention a son, or bastard son, of Pelops, named Pleisthenes, which some scholars have identified with the Pleisthenes who was the father of Agamemnon and Menelaus.

Notes

References 
 Aeschylus, Agamemnon in Aeschylus, with an English translation by Herbert Weir Smyth, Ph. D. in two volumes, Vol 2, Cambridge, Massachusetts, Harvard University Press, 1926, Online version at the Perseus Digital Library.
 Apollodorus, Apollodorus, The Library, with an English Translation by Sir James George Frazer, F.B.A., F.R.S. in 2 Volumes. Cambridge, Massachusetts, Harvard University Press; London, William Heinemann Ltd. 1921. Online version at the Perseus Digital Library.
 Armstrong, Rebecca, Cretan Women: Pasiphae, Ariadne, and Phaedra in Latin Poetry, OUP Oxford, 2006. .
 Bacchylides, Odes, translated by Diane Arnson Svarlien. 1991. Online version at the Perseus Digital Library.
 Collard, Christopher and Martin Cropp (2008a), Euripides Fragments: Aegeus–Meleanger, Loeb Classical Library No. 504, Cambridge, Massachusetts, Harvard University Press, 2008. . Online version at Harvard University Press.
 Collard, Christopher and Martin Cropp (2008b), Euripides Fragments: Oedipus-Chrysippus: Other Fragments, Loeb Classical Library No. 506, Cambridge, Massachusetts, Harvard University Press, 2008. . Online version at Harvard University Press.
 Dictys Cretensis, The Trojan War. The Chronicles of Dictys of Crete and Dares the Phrygian, translated by R. M. Frazer (Jr.). Indiana University Press. 1966.
 Euripides, Helen, translated by E. P. Coleridge in  The Complete Greek Drama, edited by Whitney J. Oates and Eugene O'Neill, Jr. Volume 2. New York. Random House. 1938. Online version at the Perseus Digital Library.
 Euripides, Iphigenia in Tauris, translated by Robert Potter in The Complete Greek Drama, edited by Whitney J. Oates and Eugene O'Neill, Jr. Volume 2. New York. Random House. 1938. Online version at the Perseus Digital Library.
 Euripides, Orestes, translated by E. P. Coleridge in The Complete Greek Drama, edited by Whitney J. Oates and Eugene O'Neill, Jr. Volume 1. New York. Random House. 1938. Online version at the Perseus Digital Library.
 Fowler, R. L. (2013), Early Greek Mythography: Volume 2: Commentary, Oxford University Press, 2013. .
 Gantz, Timothy, Early Greek Myth: A Guide to Literary and Artistic Sources, Johns Hopkins University Press, 1996, Two volumes:  (Vol. 1),  (Vol. 2).
 Grimal, Pierre, The Dictionary of Classical Mythology, Wiley-Blackwell, 1996. .
 Hard, Robin, The Routledge Handbook of Greek Mythology: Based on H.J. Rose's "Handbook of Greek Mythology", Psychology Press, 2004, . Google Books.
 Homer, The Iliad with an English Translation by A.T. Murray, Ph.D. in two volumes. Cambridge, MA., Harvard University Press; London, William Heinemann, Ltd. 1924. Online version at the Perseus Digital Library.
 Homer, The Odyssey with an English Translation by A.T. Murray, PH.D. in two volumes. Cambridge, MA., Harvard University Press; London, William Heinemann, Ltd. 1919. Online version at the Perseus Digital Library.
 Hyginus, Gaius Julius, Fabulae, in The Myths of Hyginus, edited and translated by Mary A. Grant, Lawrence: University of Kansas Press, 1960. Online version at ToposText.
 Hesiod, Catalogue of Women from Homeric Hymns, Epic Cycle, Homerica translated by Evelyn-White, H G. Loeb Classical Library Volume 57. London: William Heinemann, 1914. Online version at theio.com
 Most, G.W., Hesiod: The Shield, Catalogue of Women, Other Fragments, Loeb Classical Library, No. 503, Cambridge, Massachusetts, Harvard University Press, 2007, 2018. . Online version at Harvard University Press.
 Parada, Carlos, Genealogical Guide to Greek Mythology, Jonsered, Paul Åströms Förlag, 1993. .
 Seneca, Tragedies, Volume II: Oedipus. Agamemnon. Thyestes. Hercules on Oeta. Octavia. Edited and translated by John G. Fitch. Loeb Classical Library No. 78. Cambridge, Massachusetts: Harvard University Press, 2004. . Online version at Harvard University Press.
 Smith, William, Dictionary of Greek and Roman Biography and Mythology, London (1873). Online version at the Perseus Digital Library.
 Sommerstein, Alan H., Aeschylus: Oresteia: Agamemnon, Libation-Bearers, Eumenides, edited and translated by Alan H. Sommerstein, Loeb Classical Library No. 146. Cambridge, Massachusetts, Harvard University Press, 2009. . Online version at Harvard University Press.
 Sophocles, The Ajax of Sophocles. Edited with introduction and notes by Sir Richard Jebb, Sir Richard Jebb. Cambridge. Cambridge University Press. 1893 Online version at the Perseus Digital Library.
 Tripp, Edward, Crowell's Handbook of Classical Mythology, Thomas Y. Crowell Co; First edition (June 1970). .

Characters in Greek mythology